George Washington Putnam (March 24, 1826March 4, 1899) was an American farmer, livestock dealer, and Wisconsin pioneer.  He was a member of the Wisconsin State Assembly, representing the western half of Richland County during the 1872 and 1873 sessions.

Biography
Putnam was born on March 24, 1826, in Andover, Vermont. He later attended Black River Academy in Ludlow (village), Vermont. He relocated to Wisconsin in 1856. During the American Civil War, Putnam served with the 1st Wisconsin Heavy Artillery Regiment of the Union Army. He died in Plymouth, Vermont, in 1899.

Assembly career
Putnam was a member of the Assembly during the 1872 and 1873 sessions. He was a Republican.

References

External links

Ancestry.com

1826 births
1899 deaths
People from Windsor County, Vermont
People from Columbia County, Wisconsin
People from Richland County, Wisconsin
Republican Party members of the Wisconsin State Assembly
People of Wisconsin in the American Civil War
19th-century American politicians